"Love Shoulda Brought You Home" is the debut solo single by American singer Toni Braxton. It was written by Kenneth "Babyface" Edmonds, Daryl Simmons, and Bo Watson and produced by Edmonds and Simmons along with L.A. Reid. Originally written for singer Anita Baker, who had to decline due to her pregnancy, it was eventually recorded by Braxton and featured on the soundtrack to Reginald Hudlin's romantic comedy film Boomerang (1992). The song was later also included on Braxton's self titled debut album (1993). Lyrically, the slow-groove R&B song is saga of betrayal and infidelity that depicts a heartbroken Braxton.

The song was one out of several songs from the Boomerang soundtrack that were issued as a single by LaFace Records. Released in October 1992, "Love Shoulda Brought You Home" became Braxton's second consecutive top 40 hit on the US Billboard Hot 100, following "Give U My Heart," her duet with Babyface, charting at number thirty-three. It also reached the top five on Billboards Hot R&B/Hip-Hop Songs, peaking at number four, and entered the top 40 of the UK Singles Chart. An accompanying music video for "Love Shoulda Brought You Home" was directed by Ralph Ziman.

Background and release
"Love Shoulda Brought You Home" was written by Kenneth "Babyface" Edmonds, Daryl Simmons, and Bo Watson, and originally to be recorded by Anita Baker. Production on the track was overseen by Edmonds and Simmons along with L.A. Reid, while mixing was handled by Reid and Barney Perkins. Background vocals were provided by Braxton, Edmonds, Debra Killings, and Trina Broussard, with Watson playing keyboards and Vance Taylor playing acoustic piano. Reid and Edmonds also served as executive producers on "Love Shoulda Brought You Home".

The song served as the follow-up to Braxton's duet with Babyface, titled "Give U My Heart", her debut as a solo singer, which was also included on the soundtrack of Eddie Murphy's film, Boomerang (1992). Both songs "Give U My Heart" and "Love Shoulda Brought You Home" were originally to be recorded by Baker, but due to Baker's pregnancy, she had to decline. The title of the song is a direct line from Boomerang. In the film, Halle Berry's character, Angela Lewis, angrily tells her man, Marcus Graham, played by Murphy, after he spent the night with another woman, "Love should've brought your ass home last night."

Critical reception
Marisa Fox from Entertainment Weekly said that "Love Shoulda Brought You Home" "is a bit too much of an Anita Baker ”Real Love” clone". James Hamilton from Music Week'''s RM Dance Update described the song as a "pleasant rolling 87.8bpm sultry swayer".

Commercial performance
In the United States, "Love Shoulda Brought You Home" peaked number five on the Billboards Hot R&B Singles chart on December 5, 1992. The song spent a total of twenty nine weeks on the chart. A months later, on January 16, 1993, it peaked at number nineteen on Billboard''s Rhythmic Songs chart and number thirty-three on the Billboard Hot 100 chart. "Love Shoulda Brought You Home" also peaked at number thirty six on the Radio Songs chart.

In the United Kingdom, on November 27, 1994, "Love Shoulda Brought You Home" debuted at number thirty three on the UK Singles Chart. In its second and third week the song fell to numbers forty six and seventy five. On January 14, 1995, the song re-entered the UK Singles Chart, charting at number ninety three before falling out the top 100.

Music video
The music video for "Love Shoulda Brought You Home", directed by Ralph Ziman, showed an angry Braxton—alternating between a long sweater, worn as a dress, and a suit complete with tie. She is fed up with her boyfriend and testifies that if he really cared, then love should have brought him home last night. It was later published on Braxton's official YouTube channel in September 2010. The video has amassed more than 14 million views as of October 2021.

Track listing

Credits and personnel
Credits lifted from the single's liner notes.

 Carlton Batts – mastering 
 Toni Braxton – vocals
 Vance Taylor - acoustic piano
 Fil Brown – recording engineering
 Milton Chan – mixing engineering
 Kenneth "Babyface" Edmonds – production, writing
 Barney Perkins – engineering
 L.A. Reid – mixing, production

 Steve Schwartzberg – recording engineering
 Daryl Simmons – production, writing
 Bo Watson – writing
 Matt Westfield – recording engineering
 Sean Young – recording engineering
 Jim Zumpano – recording engineering

Charts

Weekly charts

Year-end charts

Release history

References

1990s ballads
1992 singles
Contemporary R&B ballads
Songs written for films
Songs written by Daryl Simmons
Songs written by Babyface (musician)
Toni Braxton songs
Song recordings produced by Babyface (musician)
1992 songs
LaFace Records singles
Song recordings produced by L.A. Reid
Song recordings produced by Daryl Simmons
Songs about infidelity